Caunton is a village and civil parish in the Newark and Sherwood district of Nottinghamshire on the A616,  north-west of Newark-on-Trent, in the NG23 postcode. The population (including Maplebeck and Winkburn) of the civil parish at the 2011 Census was 483.

The village is notable for its association with Samuel Hole, who is buried in the churchyard of St. Andrew's Church. He was the village's vicar for a short while before becoming Dean of Rochester and lived in the manor. The manor house now has its own equestrian centre and a mini golf course.

The village pubs are The Plough and the country pub, Caunton Beck, both on Main Street.

Caunton Mill, also known as Sharp's Mill, was a 43 ft brick tower windmill, with an ogee cap, built before 1825. It was out of use in the 1930s. The mill survives without its cap, machinery and gallery.

Caunton was used as a filming location for the majority of the second-series episodes of the popular British comedy drama Auf Wiedersehen, Pet, about a group of seven British migrant construction workers, with Beesthorpe Hall being used as Thornely Manor which was being renovated as part of the storyline.

The hamlet of Knapthorpe is to the south of the village and A616 road, and within the parish boundary.

References

External links

 Village church history website
 Cricket club
 Photo gallery
 Primary school

Villages in Nottinghamshire
Newark and Sherwood